Descontrol: Desgracias con gracia, or simply Descontrol, is a Spanish-language anthology television series produced by W Studios and Lemon Studios for Univision and Televisa. It premiered on January 7, 2018.

Cast 
 Livia Brito
 Eduardo Santamarina
 Carlos Espejel
 Mariluz Bermúdez
 Laisha Wilkins
 Alejandro Nones
 Shalim Ortiz
 Rodrigo Vidal
 Marjorie de Sousa

Episodes 
The season will consist of a total of 10 episodes.

Ratings 
 
}}

References 

Television series produced by Lemon Films
Television series produced by W Studios
2018 American television series debuts
2018 Mexican television series debuts
Univision original programming
2018 American television series endings
2018 Mexican television series endings